Considering Lily is the eponymously titled second studio album by CCM duo Considering Lily, released in 1997. Considering Lily consisted of sisters Serene Campbell and Pearl Barrett at the time of this release.

Critical reception

Melinda Hill of AllMusic gives the album 3 out of a possible 5 stars and writes, "Considering Lily's last release with Serene Campbell and Pearl Barrett is everything one could hope it would be."

Tony Cummings of Cross Rhythms gives the album an 8 out of 10 and says, "if you like the idea of nasal, little girl lost voices, across plenty of grungy guitar, and songs that speak of spiritual warfare, holiness and other vital topics, this one's for you."

Crosswalk concludes their review with, "While we can't always know God's plan for our lives, it's clear through the testimony of Jeanette and Pearl that God knows which people and circumstances to orchestrate. His timing and planning are perfect, and with Considering Lily, the pieces truly fit."

Track listing

Musicians
Serene Campbell: Lead Vocals
Pearl Barrett: Some Lead Vocals, Harmony Vocals, Acoustic Guitar, Piano
Brent Milligan: Electric & Acoustic Guitars, Bass Harmonium, Arrangements
Dan Needham: Drums
Aaron Smith: Drums (tracks 6, 7, 10)
Ed Hillary: Tambourine
Rick Roland: Tympani & Loops

Production
Producer: Brent Milligan
Executive Producers: Dan R. Brock and Eddie DeGarmo
Mastered by: Ted Jensen at Sterling Sound
Photography: Thunder Image
Art Direction: Flywheel Industries, Seattle
Management: Barbell Management
Produced and engineered by Brent Milligan at Soundwerks, Nashville, TN
Mixed by Shane Watson at Antenna Studios

Track information and credits verified from the album's liner notes.

References

External links
ForeFront Records Official Site

1997 albums
ForeFront Records albums
Contemporary Christian music albums by American artists